Leyla Gülefşan Achba (10 August 1898 – 6 November 1931) was an Abkhazian princess. She was a lady-in-waiting to Nazikeda Kadın, wife of Mehmed VI, the last Sultan of the Ottoman Empire. She is known for writing memoirs, which give details of the sultan's court life and was the first Ottoman court lady to write memoirs.

Life
Leyla Achba was born on 10 August 1898 in Achba Mansion, Horhor, Istanbul. She was a member of the Abkhazian princely family, Anchabadze, which had emigrated to Istanbul during the Russo-Turkish War (1877–78). Her father was Prince Mehmed Refik Bey Achba, and her mother was Princess Mahşeref Hanım Emkhaa, daughter of Prince Osman Bey Emukhvari and Princess Hesna Hanım Çaabalurhva.

She had three elder siblings, two brothers, Ahmed Bey, and Rifat Kemaleddin Bey, and a sister, Emine Nurbanu Hanım, and a younger sister, Feride Hanım. She was a paternal great-grandniece of Verdicenan Kadın, a wife of Sultan Abdulmejid I. She was also a maternal niece of Peyveste Hanım, and a paternal cousin of Fatma Pesend Hanım, both wives of Sultan Abdul Hamid II. 
Her paternal grandmother Ayşe Kemalifer Dziapş-Ipa was the sister of Dürrünev Kadın who was the Senior Consort of Sultan Abdulaziz. Her sister, Nurbanu renamed Hidayet Hanım married Şehzade Mehmed Burhaneddin, son of Sultan Abdülhamid II. Her cousins Nazikeda Kadın was the wife of Sultan Mehmed VI and Iryale Hanım was a consort of Şehzade Mehmed Selim, son of Sultan Abdülhamid II. Her cousin Princess Mihri Müşfik Hanım was the first female artist in Turkey.

Leyla was educated privately. She could speak French and English fluently, and had a penchant for music.

In 1916, she was engaged to Prince Hüseyin Inalipa. The marriage was supposed to take place two years later on 23 July 1918. However, the marriage didn't take place because of Hüseyin's death twenty days earlier.

In 1919 she entered court service, alongside some of her relatives. Here, her name according to the custom of the Ottoman court was changed to Gülefşan. She then became fifth lady-in-waiting to Nazikeda Kadın. She served Nazikeda until she, and the rest of Sultan's family were sent to exile in 1924.

Death
After the Turkish republic was founded, she moved to her aunt in Sivas, where she died of tuberculosis on 6 November 1931. She was buried in Yukarı Tekke.

Memoirs
Shortly before her death she wrote memoirs, which give details of the sultan's court life. Princess Achba was the first Ottoman court lady who wrote memoirs. She intended her memoirs to be reckoning, an account which would bring to light the harsh treatment her family received from the victorious republic.

Ancestry

See also
Rumeysa Aredba
Şahinde Hanım

Bibliography

References

Sources

 Rumeysa Aredba: Sultan Vahdeddinin San Remo Günleri, İstanbul 2009

1898 births
1931 deaths
20th-century writers from the Ottoman Empire
20th-century women writers from the Ottoman Empire
People from the Ottoman Empire of Abkhazian descent
20th-century deaths from tuberculosis
Women memoirists
Ladies-in-waiting of the Ottoman Empire
Tuberculosis deaths in Turkey
20th-century memoirists